Mount White is a suburb of the Central Coast region of New South Wales, Australia, located  north of Sydney. It is part of the  local government area.

It is home to a minor interchange on the Pacific Motorway.

External links

Suburbs of the Central Coast (New South Wales)